General elections were held in Western Samoa on 28 April 1948, the first to the new Legislative Assembly. The United Citizens Party won four of the five directly-elected seats.

Electoral system
The new 26-member Legislative Assembly consisted of the Administrator, six civil servants, eleven Samoans appointed by the Fono of Faipule, three Fautua (Samoan chiefs) and five members directly elected by people with European status, which included people of mixed European and Samoan descent.

Campaign
The European seats were contested between the United Citizens Party, which was formed at a meeting on 16 March and supported by prominent businessmen in Apia, and the Labour Party led by Amando Stowers. Both parties nominated a full slate of five candidates, with the United Citizens Party holding a primary election to select its candidates after nine members put themselves forwards.

The campaign included radio broadcasts, public meetings and leafleting.

Results

European members

By candidate

Samoan members
A series of meetings was held in January 1948 to select the 11 Samoan representatives. However, the meetings were inconclusive, and instead a list of 31 names was given to the three , Mata'afa, Malietoa and Tamasese to choose from. The choices were announced in mid-April.

Aftermath
The new Legislative Assembly was opened on 2 June 1948 with a ceremony at Mulinu'u involving the new national flag being formally raised for the first time.

After the death of Fautua Mata'afa Faumuina Fiame Mulinu'u I in 1948, the Fono requested that they be allowed to elect a twelfth member to replace him. This was authorised by the Samoa Amendment Act 1949, and Gatoloai Peseta Sio was elected by the Fono to be the twelfth member on 1 April 1950.

References

Elections in Samoa
Western Samoa
General